Kurgashka (Qurğaş) is a rural locality (a village) in Karlykhanovsky Selsoviet, Belokataysky District, Bashkortostan, Russia. The population was 13 as of 2010. There is 1 street.

Geography 
Kurgashka is located 40 km north of Novobelokatay (the district's administrative centre) by road. Sandalashka is the nearest rural locality.

References 

Rural localities in Belokataysky District